Švanda Theatre in Smíchov is a theater in Štefánikova street in Smíchov a suburb of Prague. It continues the long tradition of the previous theater based in this building and its surroundings.

A theater was established  on the site in 1871 by Pavel Švanda called Arena Eggenberg but the arena was demolished in 1891, an built a new arena the current Smíchov, theater.

In 1900 the theater was radically rebuilt when the position of the stage and auditorium was changed, and the layout has been preserved. In 1908, then it was renamed the Intimate Theatre. In 1928, during the beginning of the economic crisis was dissolved file  and in the building of the theater was owned by several tenants. In the years 1928-1930 he became the theater Vlasta Burian, in 1931–1932, then comic theater (Ferenc futurist and Jara Kohout). Since 1932 the theater has once again as Švandovo theater in 1935-1938 then letting Jara Kohout and from 1939 to 1944, then Jaroslav planks.

After the war, authorities banned its traditional theatrical business and there arose soviet version of the Realistic theater, including a 1953 renaming the realistic theater Zdenek Nejedly.  In 1991 with the fall of communism it was renamed the Theatre Labyrinth.  In  1998 the theater was long closed  but re-opened in 2002 as Švanda Theatre in Smíchov.

References

Theatres in Prague
Music venues in Prague
Smíchov
2002 establishments in the Czech Republic
1881 establishments in Austria-Hungary
Theatres completed in 1881
Theatres completed in 2002
21st-century architecture in the Czech Republic